Hyderabad Airport may refer to:

In India
 Begumpet Airport, a defunct airport in Hyderabad, Telangana
 Rajiv Gandhi International Airport, also known as Hyderabad International Airport, the current active airport serving Hyderabad, Telangana

In Pakistan
 Hyderabad Airport (Pakistan), the airport serving Hyderabad, Sindh